Overture to The Merry Wives of Windsor (also known as The Merry Wives of Windsor Overture) is a 1953 American short musical film produced by Johnny Green. It won an Oscar in 1954 for Best Short Subject (One-Reel). The film consists of the MGM Symphony Orchestra playing the Overture to Otto Nicolai's opera The Merry Wives of Windsor, conducted by Johnny Green.

Cast
 Johnny Green as Himself

References

External links

1953 films
1953 musical films
American musical films
Films based on The Merry Wives of Windsor
Live Action Short Film Academy Award winners
Metro-Goldwyn-Mayer short films
1950s English-language films
1950s American films